Nathan Cooper was an attorney elected to serve in the Missouri House of Representatives in 2004 as a Republican.

He resigned this position in 2007 after pleading to immigration irregularities. The Missouri Supreme Court suspended his license to practice law for the same reason. Cooper now owns a number of properties in the city of St. Louis, where he has earned a reputation as a 'voucher specialist'. He was born in Potosi, Missouri.

References

Living people
Republican Party members of the Missouri House of Representatives
People from Potosi, Missouri
Missouri politicians convicted of crimes
21st-century American politicians
Year of birth missing (living people)